Concepción Province is one of four provinces of the Chilean region of Bío Bío (VIII). Its capital, Concepción, is part of the Greater Concepción conurbation, the nation's second largest metropolitan area after Santiago.

Administration
As a province, Concepción is a second-level administrative division of Chile, governed by a provincial governor who is appointed by the president.

Communes
The province comprises twelve communes, each governed by a municipality consisting of an elected alcalde and municipal council.

Concepción
Coronel
Chiguayante
Florida
Hualpén
Hualqui
Lota
Penco
San Pedro de la Paz
Santa Juana
Talcahuano
Tomé

Geography and demography
It is the second most populated province after the more than five times larger Santiago Province (pop. 4,668,473). Of these, 879,854 (96.4%) lived in urban areas and 33,035 (3.6%) in rural areas. Between the 1992 and 2002 censuses, the population grew by 8.5% (71,444 persons).

References

Provinces of Biobío Region
Provinces of Chile